Glass Eels is a play written by Nell Leyshon, broadcast on BBC Radio 4 in July 2003.
The play has also been performed on stage at the Hampstead Theatre, it is the second part of a planned quartet of Somerset plays covering the four seasons the first being the award winning Comfort Me with Apples.

The play is set on the Somerset Levels one August, probably on the River Parrett. While it explores a young girl's sexual awakening, and her acceptance of past loss, it also concerns eel fishing and a dying rural way of life.

References 

Plays by Nell Leyshon
2003 plays